Brian Ronald Devoil (born 20 July 1954) is a British drummer who was a founding member of the band Twelfth Night.

References

1954 births
Living people
Place of birth missing (living people)
British rock drummers
20th-century British musicians
British male drummers